Poecilosomella brevisecunda is a species of fly belonging to the family Sphaeroceridae. It has only been recorded from Gunung Leuser National Park in northern Sumatra, Indonesia.

This is a tiny fly up to 2mm in length. It is a generally dark brown species with prominent light-coloured rings on the legs and a shiny yellowish facial plate. The wings are also dark, with pale crossveins. The halteres have a yellow stalk with a brown knob.

References

Sphaeroceridae
Insects described in 2002
Diptera of Asia
Endemic fauna of Sumatra